The 2013 Bulgarian Cup Final was the 73rd final of the Bulgarian Cup, and was contested between Beroe Stara Zagora and Levski Sofia on 15 May 2013. The match finished in a 3–3 draw, but Beroe clinched their second ever Bulgarian Cup title by winning 3–1 on penalties.

Route to the final

Pre-match
Beroe reached the final for the second time in the last 3 years. The last time being in 2010 when they celebrated their first and only trophy in the competition. Levski on their side reached their first Bulgarian Cup final since 2007. The blues also hold the record in the tournament by winning 25 cups. This will be the second final in history held between these two clubs. The first one being in 1979 won by Levski with 4-1.

The final will take place at Lovech Stadium in Lovech. The stadium has more than 8100 seating places with pitch dimensions of 105 x 68 metres. Each of the two teams was allocated 3,700 tickets for the final, while the remainder went to the grassroots football community.

Match

Details

See also
2012–13 A Group

References

Bulgarian Cup finals
Cup Final
PFC Levski Sofia matches
Bulgarian Cup Final 2013